The Order of Merit of Berlin is this highest award of the German State of Berlin.  Awarded in the name of the Senate of Berlin, the order had recognized outstanding contributions to the State of Berlin since 21 July 1987.  Awarded each year on 1 October, the anniversary of the Berlin Constitution, the order is limited to no more than 400 living recipients.  As of 2016 the order had been awarded 431 times, to 152 women and 279 men.

Design of the order
The Order of Merit of Berlin is awarded in a single class.  The badge of the order is a white enamel Maltese cross edged in red.  In the center of the cross is a depiction of the golden crowned Coat of arms of Berlin surrounded by a gold wreath.  It is worn around the neck on a white ribbon with red edges.

Notable recipients
Franziska van Almsick
Stefan Arndt
Vladimir Ashkenazy
Seyran Ateş
Hani Azer
Marianne Birthler
Eberhard Diepgen
Paul van Dyk
Rudi Fehr
Klaus and Eva Herlitz
Inge Keller
Don Jackson
Lena Schöneborn
Milan Popadić
Judy Winter
Jenny Wolf
Walter H. Yates, Jr.
Heinz Dürr

See also
List of Holders of the Order of Merit of Berlin (German Wikipedia)

References

Berlin
Berlin
Culture in Berlin